The  is a Japanese funicular line on Mount Rokkō in Kobe, Hyōgo. It is the only railway line  operates, while it also operates bus lines. The line opened in 1932.

See also

List of funicular railways
List of railway companies in Japan
List of railway lines in Japan
Maya Cablecar
Maya Ropeway
Rokkō Arima Ropeway
Shin-Kōbe Ropeway

References

External links 
 Rokkō Maya Railway official website 

Funicular railways in Japan
Rail transport in Hyōgo Prefecture
1067 mm gauge railways in Japan
1932 establishments in Japan
Transport in Kobe